Midland Great Western Railway (MGWR) Classes 1,2,3,4,5 and 13 were 2-2-2 locomotives acquired over the period 1847-1862 serving the railway in its formative years.

MGWR Class 1

The MGWR Class 1 were supplied by Thomas Grendon and Company from April 1847 with Dunsandle performing the trials and opening run. These engines were a replacement for a cancelled order from J & R Mallet of Seville Ironworks Dublin and arrived before the earlier order for MGWR Class 2 from Fairbairn.  Juno was later converted into a 2-2-2T tank locomotive.

MGWR Class 2

Fairbairn supplied 6 engines in response to a quote in 1846, the engines being delivered from June 1847.  They seem to have accumulated less average mileages than MGWR Class 1 and were withdrawn within 10 years apart from Orion which was converted to a tank engine in 1852.

MGWR Class 3

The six MGWR Class 3 locomotives were also supplied by Fairbairn in 1848.  Built to a different design they had a longer service life than the Fairbairn Class 2.

MGWR Class 4

The MGWR Class 4 from Fairbairn were 2-2-2 Well Tank locomotives ordered for the MGWR's Galway extension in 1851.  One of the original order of 4 was believed to have been sent to Brazil.  They had a long service life of nearly 50 years with some remaining in use as stationary boilers up to 1906.

MGWR Class 5

With the exception of Class 13 all subsequent locomotive builds for the MGWR were of engines with the driving wheels connected by coupling rods for better adhesion.  The MGWR Class 5 engines were themselves rebuilt as 2-4-0s beforce withdrawal and renumbered in the range 88-93.

MGWR Class 13

The final set of six 2-2-2 passenger locomotives for the MGWR designated Class 13 built by R & W Hawthorn of Leith, Scotland. They had double-sandwich frames, outside springs and  cylinders. They were renumbered 43-48 between 1871 and 1873 switching the number range with MGWR Class 12 so all passenger engines could be brought into the number range 1 to 48.}  Their final years saw them displaced from main line to branch services.

Notes

References

Sources

2-2-2 locomotives
5 ft 3 in gauge locomotives
Railway locomotives introduced in 1847
01
Scrapped locomotives
Thomas Grendon and Company locomotives
Steam locomotives of Ireland